The first season of Charmed, an American supernatural drama television series created by Constance M. Burge, originally aired in the United States on The WB from October 7, 1998, through May 26, 1999. Paramount Home Entertainment released the complete first season in a six-disc DVD box set on February 1, 2005, and was released as a high-definition blu-ray on October 30, 2018.

Synopsis 
The Halliwell sisters discover that they are descendants of a long line of witches when they inherit a house from their grandmother and find the family's Book of Shadows. They learn that they each have a unique power. The strong-willed Prudence "Prue" Halliwell (Shannen Doherty) can mentally move objects with her mind via her eyes and hands, reserved Piper Halliwell (Holly Marie Combs) is able to temporarily freeze time, and the uninhibited Phoebe Halliwell (Alyssa Milano) has the mental power of premonition. Together they have the "Power of Three", which they must use to fight demons and warlocks, and protect the innocent.

Cast and Characters

Main 
 Shannen Doherty as Prue Halliwell
 Holly Marie Combs as Piper Halliwell
 Alyssa Milano as Phoebe Halliwell
 T. W. King as Andy Trudeau
 Dorian Gregory as Darryl Morris

Special guest
Brenda Bakke as Charon

Recurring 
 Neil Roberts as Rex Buckland
 Leigh-Allyn Baker as Hannah Webster
 Brian Krause as Leo Wyatt
 Cristine Rose as Claire Pryce
 Shawn Christian as Josh
 Carlos Gómez as Inspector Rodriguez

Guest 
Matthew Ashford as Roger
Tony Denison as Victor Bennett
John Cho as Mark Chao
Matt Schulze as Whitaker Berman
Danielle Harris as Aviva
Rebecca Balding as Jackie
Billy Drago as Barbas, the Demon of Fear
Jennifer Rhodes as Penny Halliwell
Tyler Layton as Melinda Warren
Bernie Kopell as Coroner
Finola Hughes as Patty Halliwell
Michael Weatherly as Brendan Rowe
Raphael Sbarge as Brent Miller
Jeff Kober as Jackson Ward
Michael Trucco as Alec
Lisa Robin Kelly as Daisy
David Carradine as Tempus
Scott Plank as Eric Lohman

Episodes

Notes

Reception
Charmed received mixed reviews for its first episode. The Hollywood Reporters Barry Garron wrote that this show is "Funny, Spooky, and Wonderfully Entertaining". David Bianculi of the New York Daily News wrote that it had room to grow, "As Buster Poindexter once sang, they're hot, hot, hot...If Charmed gets more savvy, scary and sexy as weeks go on, and it's a good bet it will, falling under its spell will be an easy thing to do." Howard Rosenberg of the Los Angeles Times disagreed with Bianculi and Garron, "There's no magic, black or otherwise, in The WB's Charmed, a limp drama about three sisters who discover they are witches."

References

External links 
 
 

Charmed (TV series)
Charmed (TV series) episodes
1998 American television seasons
1999 American television seasons